The 2009 season of the Belgian Football League (BFL) is the regular season played in the Belgium. The first week starts on February 8 and ends with the 12th week April 26. Then the Playoffs follow in the 14th and 15th week. The 2 remaining teams then compete in the championship Belgian Bowl XXII.This is played in the 17th week on May 30, 2009.

Regular season

Regular season standings
W = Wins, L = Losses, T = Ties, PCT = Winning Percentage, PF= Points For, PA = Points Against

 – clinched seed to the playoffs

Post season

In the 2009 playoffs the Tigers played in the quarter final against the Brussels Black Angels on May 10. The Tigers gave forfait after the halftime resulting in a 50–0 defeat.

References

American football in Belgium
BFL
BFL